Reformation Europe, 1517–1559 is a 1963 book written by Geoffrey Elton.

Content
The book is an analysis of the religious, economic, cultural and political history of Europe during the period of the Reformation. He examines the history of the period through the interrelationships between different forces in Europe at the time, such as the Holy Roman Emperor Charles V, the Papacy, reformers such as Martin Luther, John Calvin, Martin Bucer and Zwingli, and explores the resultant Counter-Reformation and the beginnings of European colonisation of other parts of the world such as South America. Its central focus is upon the conflict between Luther and Charles V.

According to one scholar, the book was written in a way which helped Reformation studies to emerge from a partisan situation where Protestant history was largely written by Protestants and Catholic history written by Catholics, in this sense representing the 'secularisation' of the period's historical interpretation. Elton also wrote from a particular intellectual framework of his own, however, being antithetical towards radical movements such as the Anabaptists in a way that drew some criticism at the time of publication.

Much of the work is largely narrative and chronological in tone and structure, though there are important points of interpretation: one key conclusion that Elton comes to, for example, is a repudiation of the Weberian thesis of a link between the Protestant revolution and a nascent 'spirit of capitalism' associated with a rising middle-class. Elton asserts that there is not ample factual evidence to support such a framework and concludes that it is sad that so many historians have devoted their time and energy to what he perceives of as an illusory belief.

Chapters
 1. Luther
 The Attack on Rome
 The State of Germany
 2. Charles V
 3. Years of Triumph
 The Progress of Lutheranism
 Zwingli
 The Wars of Charles V
 4. The Radicals
 5. Outside Germany
 The South
 The West
 The North
 The East
 6. The Formation of Parties
 The Emergence of Protestantism
 The Search for a Solution
 7. The Revival of Rome
 Catholic Reform
 Counter-Reformation
 The Jesuits & the New Papacy
 8. Calvin
 The Meaning of Calvinism
 The Reformation in Geneva
 The Spread of Calvinism
 9. War & Peace
 The Triumph of Charles V
 The Defeat of Charles V
 The End of an Age
 10. The Age
 The Religious Revolution
 Art, Literature & Learning
 The Nation State
 Society
 The Expansion of Europe

References

1963 non-fiction books
History books about the 16th century
Harper & Row books